Lambach is a market town in the Wels-Land district of the Austrian state of Upper Austria on the Ager and Traun Rivers. A major stop on the salt trade, it is the site of the Lambach Abbey, built around 1056. Notable alumnus from the local elementary school is Adolf Hitler, who attended the establishment in the 1890s.

History

The famous Abbey of Lambach was founded in 1056 by bishop Adalbero of Würzburg.

Population

Personalities
Anton Edler von Gapp, the noted Austrian jurist, was born in Lambach.

Lambach was the home of Dr. Ignaz Harrer who, from 1872 to 1875, was the mayor of Salzburg.

Adolf Hitler lived here from 1897–1898. He attended 3rd grade in the local primary school.

References

Cities and towns in Wels-Land District